Anania impunctata is a moth in the family Crambidae. It was described by Warren in 1897. It is found in Botswana, Ethiopia, Lesotho, Malawi, Mozambique, South Africa, Zambia and Zimbabwe.

References

Moths described in 1897
Pyraustinae
Moths of Africa